Hypatopa vitis is a moth in the family Blastobasidae. It is found in Costa Rica.

The length of the forewings is about 6.5 mm. The forewings are pale brown intermixed with brownish-orange scales and few brown scales. The hindwings are translucent pale brown, gradually darkening towards the apex.

Etymology
The specific name is derived from Latin vitis (a centurion's staff made of a branch of a vine.)

References

Moths described in 2013
Hypatopa
Moths of Central America